Woollins' reagent is an organic compound containing phosphorus and selenium. Analogous to Lawesson's reagent, it is used mainly as a selenation reagent. It is named after John Derek Woollins.

Preparation 
Woollins' reagent is commercially available. It can also be conveniently prepared in the laboratory by heating a mixture of dichlorophenylphosphine and sodium selenide (Na2Se), (itself prepared from reacting elementary selenium with sodium in liquid ammonia). An alternative synthesis is the reaction of the pentamer (PPh)5 (pentaphenylcyclopentaphosphine) with elemental selenium.

Applications 
The main use of Woollins' reagent is the selenation of carbonyl compounds. For instance, Woollins' reagent will convert a carbonyl into a selenocarbonyl. Additionally, Woollins' reagent  has been used to selenonate carboxylic acids, alkenes, alkynes, and nitriles.

References 

Phosphorus heterocycles
Organoselenium compounds
Reagents for organic chemistry
Four-membered rings
Selenium(−II) compounds
Phosphorus(V) compounds